The Scarlet Lily is a 1923 American silent drama film directed by Victor Schertzinger and starring Katherine MacDonald, Orville Caldwell and Stuart Holmes.

Cast
 Katherine MacDonald as Dora Mason 
 Orville Caldwell as Lawson Dean 
 Stuart Holmes as Jessup Barnes 
 Edith Lyle as Mrs. Barnes 
 Adele Farrington as Trixie Montresse 
 J. Gordon Russell as Laurence Peyton 
 Grace Morse as Beatrice Milo 
 Jane Miskimin as Little Mollie 
 Lincoln Stedman as John Rankin 
 Gertrude Quality as Mrs. Rosetta Bowen

References

Bibliography
 James Robert Parish & Michael R. Pitts. Film directors: a guide to their American films. Scarecrow Press, 1974.

External links
 

1923 films
1923 drama films
1920s English-language films
American silent feature films
Silent American drama films
Films directed by Victor Schertzinger
American black-and-white films
First National Pictures films
Preferred Pictures films
1920s American films